Harry William Winkler, Jr. (born April 10, 1945) is an American former Olympic handballer and retired school teacher.  He was also a member of the U.S. Men's handball team at the 1972 Summer Olympics and the U.S. Men's handball team at the 1976 Summer Olympics and coached the U.S. Women’s Olympic handball team at the 1984 Olympics in Los Angeles.  He retired from teaching at Forest Hill Community High School after over 30 years in 2009.

Early life
Winkler was born in Philadelphia. He graduated from Forest Hill High School in West Palm Beach, Florida, in 1963. Winkler attended the University of Florida.  Norm Sloan recruited him from Forest Hill Community High School to play basketball for the Gators. After graduation, Winkler served as an officer in the United States Army. It was in the Army that he learned team handball.

Olympics
In 1972, Winkler joined the U.S. Olympic handball team, retiring from active competition in 1977.  He competed in the 1972 and 1976 Summer Olympics.

Honors
In 1963, he was named "Athlete of the Week" by WPEC-TV. In 1981, he was inducted into the Palm Beach County Sports Hall of Fame. He was cited for his achievements in basketball, track, and team handball.

References

1945 births
Living people
People from Palm Beach County, Florida
American male handball players
Olympic handball players of the United States
Handball players at the 1972 Summer Olympics
Handball players at the 1976 Summer Olympics
Forest Hill Community High School alumni